Calonectria colhounii is a fungal plant pathogen.

References

Nectriaceae
Fungi described in 1973